Lake Wapello is a man-made lake in the U.S. state of Iowa,  west of the town of
Drakesville. The lake is entirely contained in Lake Wapello State Park, which promotes recreational use of the lake. The lake is named for Chief Wapello of the Meskwaki tribe.

References

External links
 Iowa Department of Natural Resources park overview
 Iowa DNR lake summary

Wapello